The ninth gubernatorial election for the city of Bangkok, Thailand was held on 11 January 2009. The election came about after the resignation of Apirak Kosayothin on 13 November 2008,  the incumbent who was only just re-elected a little more than a month (on 5 October 2008). the resignation stemmed from an indictment by the National Counter Corruption Commission or NCCC, in which Apirak was indicted for the controversial 6.6 billion Baht fire-engine procurement contract. The former Prime Minister and former Bangkok Governor Samak Sundaravej was also found guilty in the same verdict. On 13 November Apirak announced his resignation saying: "Like the Democrat Party, I support a move that will perpetuate politics-for-people" at the same time maintaining his innocence and stating that his resignation should become an example of a change in Thai politics, his resignation triggered an automatic by-election. By the end of the 11 January 2009, Sukhumband was declared the winner of the race, becoming the 15th Governor of Bangkok.

Campaign
On 1 December, the Election Commission allowed the registration of candidates. A total of 14 candidates registered. In accordance with the law, they picked numbers by which they would be assigned for the campaign. The three highest profile candidates were: MR Sukhumbhand Paribatra, ML Nattakorn Devakula and Yuranun Pamornmontri.

MR Sukhumbhand Paribatra, the 56-year-old candidate of the Democrat Party, is a former Foreign Minister. MR Sukhumband vowed to carry on with policies initiated by Governor Apirak and to continue the environmentalist agenda. He ran under the slogan: "Bring back Bangkokians' smiles".

ML Nattakorn Devakula, a 32-year-old Independent candidate, was a former TV host, popularly known as "Khun Pluem". He ran on the slogan: "Vote for me. Vote for the governor of the future".

Yuranun Pamornmontri, the 45-year-old Puea Thai Party candidate,  is a popular TV actor and film star.

Media
Election posters of the Candidates:

Results
The election and results were announced on the same day:

References

Bangkok gubernatorial elections
Gubernatorial election,2009
2009 elections in Asia
2009 elections in Thailand
2009 in Bangkok
2009 in Thailand
January 2009 events in Thailand